John Henry Ducachet Wingfield (September 24, 1833 – July 27, 1898) was the first bishop of the Episcopal Diocese of Northern California, serving in that capacity from 1874 to 1898. He was consecrated as missionary bishop of Northern California on December 2, 1874, but remained in charge of his parish in Petersburg, Virginia until April 1875.

Biography
John Henry Ducachet Wingfield was born in Portsmouth, Virginia on September 24, 1833. He was educated at St. Timothy's College in Maryland and the College of William & Mary, winning a prize for best essay at the latter.

He died in Benicia, California on July 27, 1898.

References

1833 births
1898 deaths
College of William & Mary alumni
People from Portsmouth, Virginia
Episcopal bishops of Northern California
19th-century American clergy